When Loud Weather Buffeted Naoshima is a limited edition CD by English musician David Sylvian that was commissioned as an installation piece by the Naoshima Fukutake Art Museum Foundation on the island of Naoshima, Japan, as part of the "NAOSHIMA STANDARD 2" exhibition which ran from October 2006 to April 2007. The album consists of one long ambient instrumental track. Writing in The Guardian, John L. Walters described it as "possibly the most avant-garde product made by a pop musician since Metal Machine Music".

The piece is an atmospheric ambient soundscape and musique concrète sound collage of found sounds. According to David Sylvian's official website:

Track listing

Personnel
David Sylvian – composer, producer, mixing, art director

Ensemble:
Clive Bell
Christian Fennesz
Arve Henriksen
Akira Rabelais

Additional personnel
Chris Bigg – artwork
Sachiyo Tsurumi – artwork
Yuka Fujii – art director

References

David Sylvian albums
2007 albums
Samadhi Sound albums
Experimental music albums by English artists
Ambient albums by English artists
Sound collage albums
Musique concrète albums